Lăpușata is a commune located in Vâlcea County, Oltenia, Romania. It is composed of seven villages: Berești, Broșteni, Mijați, Sărulești (the commune centre), Scorușu, Șerbănești and Zărnești.

References

Communes in Vâlcea County
Localities in Oltenia